Beaumont Provincial Park is a provincial park located at the southeast end of Fraser Lake, between Fort Fraser and the town of Fraser Lake, British Columbia, approximately 40 km west of Vanderhoof, British Columbia.  The park contains the site of the original Fort Fraser.

Facilities include
 49 campsites
 a boat launch
 a day picnic area
 a swimming beach
 a sani-station

Fraser Mountain
There is a 4 km long trail up Mount Fraser that starts across the highway but still within the Beaumont park boundary. At the top is an old forest service tower that provides a clear view of the surrounding area. Some of the steepest sections of the trail once made up a small ski hill, which operated in the late 60s and early 70s, complete with a rope-tow. It takes an estimated 3 hours to ascend the mountain. The trailhead is located between the park entrance and Piper's Glen Resort.

References

External links

Provincial parks of British Columbia
Nechako Country
1960 establishments in British Columbia